Dola Sen (born 26 March 1967) is an Indian politician and trade unionist. From 2020 she is now the central president of the Indian National Trinamool Trade Union Congress (INTTUC).

She has completed her B.Sc (Mathematics) from Calcutta University, Kolkata in year 1990. She resides at Tegharia, Rajarhat.

She was fielded by the All India Trinamool Congress as its candidate for the Asansol Lok Sabha seat in the 2014 Indian general election.

She was elected to Rajya Sabha the Upper House of Indian Parliament from West Bengal.

On 21 September 2020, Dola Sen along with seven other members were suspended from the Rajya Sabha for their unruly behaviour in the house by tearing documents, breaking mics, standing on tables and heckling the Deputy Chairman of the Rajya Sabha. Their actions were condemned by several leaders.

References

Living people
1967 births
Politicians from Kolkata
Trinamool Congress politicians from West Bengal
Rajya Sabha members from West Bengal
Women in West Bengal politics
Indian women trade unionists
Trade unionists from West Bengal
20th-century Indian women politicians
20th-century Indian politicians
21st-century Indian women politicians
21st-century Indian politicians
Women members of the Rajya Sabha